The A15 is a major road in England. It runs north from Peterborough via Market Deeping, Bourne, Sleaford and Lincoln along a variety of ancient, Roman, and Turnpike alignments before it is interrupted at its junction with the M180 near Scawby.

Driving conditions
Norman Cross to Bourne takes 33 minutes, Bourne to Lincoln takes 46 minutes, and Lincoln to the Humber Bridge takes 54 minutes.

A section of the A15 (between Scampton and the M180) provides the longest stretch of straight road in the UK.

Route

Peterborough

The A15 is Peterborough's main connecting road from the south to the A1(M), joining near Stilton, at Norman Cross. It begins as London Road at junction 16 of the A1(M) with the B1043 (former A1) in Cambridgeshire and the district of North West Cambridgeshire. From here to Yaxley it passes the Norman Cross Hotel and follows the City of Peterborough and Cambridgeshire boundary, where there is a junction with the B1091 (for Farcet).

It enters the City of Peterborough near Hampton Vale on the left, and meets the A1260 The Serpentine, which leads to two much faster routes around Peterborough. Next is a roundabout for the Cygnet Park business park on the left, home of the new headquarters of News International. It enters Old Fletton near the headquarters of Hotpoint to the left. There is a staggered junction with the A1129 and it crosses the East Coast Main Line. It passes Peterborough United on the right in New Fletton. It meets the start of the A605 at a roundabout and crosses the River Nene.

The A15 takes two routes through Peterborough:
 The route on the west side begins as Bourges Boulevard at Peterborough Combined Court Centre, meets the A1179 (former A47), passes the Peterborough railway station and meets three roundabouts near Millfield and New England. It follows the East Coast Main Line and becomes Lincoln Road and Werrington Parkway after the A47 GSJ. It passes four roundabouts, crossing the Peterborough to Lincoln Line.
 The route on the east side starts at the Eye roundabout with the A1139 at Newark, then follows the dual-carriageway Paston Parkway, which meets the A47. It continues as a dual-carriageway (opened in spring 2008) at the next roundabout at Gunthorpe and follows the Car Dyke then meets another roundabout at Werrington before becoming a single carriageway and crosses the Spalding railway between Werrington and Glinton .

Both routes head through Werrington (passing either side) before joining again at Glinton with the roundabout with the B1443. There is another roundabout. with the B1443 (for Helpston). It passes Etton and meets a roundabout with the B1524 (former route through Market Deeping), B1162 (for Northborough to the right) and an exit for Maxey to the right.

Kesteven
Just south of the Welland Gate roundabout on the A1175 and B1166, it crosses the River Welland so entering South Kesteven in Lincolnshire. The roundabout marks the western end of the £7 million  Market Deeping bypass, finished in July 1998. The A15 and A1175 roads are now merged in a  dual-carriageway stretch. It meets the B1524 (former route) at a roundabout and heads to the left as Peterborough Road Bourne Road and Deeping Road.

North of Baston is the Waterside Garden Centre close to where it meets the north–south Roman Road King Street, which it follows until just north of Bourne. It goes over the River Glen at the point it is crossed by the Macmillan Way, at Kate's Bridge.

There is a left turn for Obthorpe and it goes through Thurlby, passing the Horseshoe pub, then Northorpe, before coming to the small town of Bourne. It meets the recently diverted A151 at a new roundabout (the A151 leaves to the right  further on), where the road becomes South Road. It passes Bourne Grammar School, then after some treacherous bends near Bourne Abbey becomes South Street, with the town's Heritage centre and war memorial gardens on the left by the Bourne Eau. At the crossroads in the centre of town it crosses the B1193 (original route of the A151) in the historic market place(), where are located the Nags Head, Angel Hotel, Burghley Arms. As North Street, it passes the Burghley Centre (shops), and Bourne Bus Station. At the two miniature roundabouts the name changes to North Road, which name it keeps until it reaches Morton.

It passes close to Dyke, and goes through Morton as Bourne Road, passing the Lord Nelson pub. It becomes Folkingham Road there is a right turn for Haconby and a junction with the B1177 (for Billingborough). Close by are Rippingale and Kirkby Underwood. Between Rippingale and Aslackby a wooded lay-by known locally as 'Turnpike Bar' marks the deviation from the line of the Roman Road Mareham Lane. The A15 passes by Aslackby and the Robin Hood and Little John, and then through the middle of Folkingham.

There is the Threekingham Bar roundabout with the east–west A52, and it goes through Osbournby, as London Road the primary school]. It passes the Tally Ho Inn near Aswarby, then there are left turns for Aunsby and Swarby. Sleaford and Silk Willoughby were on the A15, which slowed traffic down as the traffic went across a level crossing and through Sleaford's shopping area. The £5.7 million bypass opened on 16 September 1993, by Douglas Hogg, where there is a roundabout with the A153 and B1517. The A15 crosses the railway and River Slea, and then leaves the bypass at the Holdingham Roundabout with the A17 and B1518 (former route).

As Lincoln Road, it goes close to Leasingham meeting the B1209. There is a junction Cranwell with the B1429. It meets the B1191 (for Scopwick), B1202 (for Boothby Graffoe to the west and Metheringham to the east) next to the former RAF Coleby Grange, and B1178 (for Harmston), where it passes Dunston Pillar. At Nocton Heath, it passes the Kitchen cafe. On the route to Lincoln, it goes near to two RAF bases – RAF Digby, which is used for communications rather than as a flying station, and across the end of the runway of RAF Waddington, which flies AWACS and Nimrod aircraft. A parking place and cafe are provided for plane spotters on the eastern side of the road.

Next to the runway at Waddington is an old Vulcan, carrying the number of the plane that bombed Port Stanley.

South of Bracebridge Heath, the A15 heads east around the city using the A15 Lincoln Eastern Bypass, a  single carriageway opened on 19 December 2020. The route is designed to allow for easy widening to a dual carriageway if necessary in the future. The bypass has three roundabouts, two bridges and one underpass before reaching the River Witham. The road crosses over the river on a viaduct before entering Lincoln for a short distance before entering Lindsey.

Lindsey

The bypass continues north, entering West Lindsey, before meeting the Greetwell Road roundabout and then terminating at the Wragby Road roundabout. The A15 then runs unbroken northwestwards to the Riseholme roundabout, where it briefly re-enters the City of Lincoln, then follows the Roman road Ermine Street past the Riseholme College of Agriculture on the right, now part of the University of Lincoln, and Lincolnshire Showground to the left. At the end of a  section is the Tillbridge Lane roundabout with the A1500, for Gainsborough. From here, it used to be straight, but with RAF Scampton becoming a base for Avro Vulcan V bombers in the 1950s, the runway had to be extended and the road now has a curved diversion to the east. The formerly straight line still forms the border of many strip parishes in the area, such as between Scampton and Welton, whose borders were first put in place based on Ermine Street. It passes the Scampton primary school and continues past a right turn to Normanby by Spital, on its most straight section, also the parish boundary of many local villages. At the roundabout with the A631 at Caenby Corner, there is the Total Caenby Corner Garage just south of Spital-in-the-Street. Overtaking is difficult as the road, although straight, is undulating with unmarked dips and slow moving farm traffic. There are two right turns for Bishop Norton and Atterby. There is a right turn for Snitterby and a left turn for Blyborough. At the B1205 staggered crossroads (for Waddingham to the east, and Grayingham to the west), it enters North Lincolnshire.

At the B1206 crossroads, the old route used to go through Hibaldstow and Brigg, with the former road to Redbourne now a cycle route. It passes close to Kirton in Lindsey, home of RAF Kirton in Lindsey much used in the Second World War as a fighter airfield in 12 Group, now home to the Trent Valley Gliding Club. Hibaldstow was a wartime fighter airfield as well, and this is now used as a base for parachuting and parachuting competitions by Target Skysports. The  £7 million Brigg and Redbourne bypass was added in December 1989 which follows the old Ermine Street in North Lincolnshire further than previously, with a much flatter, wider and safer road. This section was the upgraded route of an unclassified road. It crosses the Sheffield to Cleethorpes railway line near the deserted village of Gainsthorpe, passes near to Scawby, and joining the M180 at junction 4, near Scunthorpe. It abandons the Roman alignments at a short spur to the A18 at the Briggate Lodge Roundabout next to the Forest Pines golf club and hotel at Broughton. Ermine Street continues north as the B1207, meeting the Humber near Winteringham.

The route of the A15 now becomes part of the three-laned M180, which was opened on 2 September 1977. The A15 section along Ermine Street was planned to be opened at the same time, but it had to wait twelve years. The buildup of traffic to Grimsby prompted calls for the Brigg bypass for many years, but the Flixborough explosion of 1974 made it more of an emergency. This section goes under the A18, over the River Ancholme, over the old route of the A15 (B1206) and over the South Trans-Pennine railway. At junction 5, the A15 reforms at the dual-grade Barnetby Top Interchange, which is crossed by the Viking Way and has an exit to Elsham. It continues north as a dual carriageway which carries about as little traffic as the M180. The M180 drops to two lanes under this roundabout and continues to Grimsby and Immingham as the A180.

The A15 towards the Humber Bridge, goes directly across the runways of the former RAF Bomber Command airfield at RAF Elsham Wolds (where over 1,000 of its aircrew were killed), which is now the Elsham Wolds Industrial Estate. The former route of the A15, pre-1978, is now called B1206, and ends at New Holland, where the A15 formerly connected with the Humber Ferry. The £5.6 million  Brigg Bypass to Barton-upon-Humber Bypass (up to where the B1218 crosses) section opened in June 1978.

The £2 million  Barton-upon-Humber Bypass to Humber Bridge (A1077 interchange) section opened in September 1978, although some maps show this being open before the southern section to the M180. When this section opened to the GSJ with the A1077 (for South Ferriby) in 1978, there was no longer any access to the B1218. In the early 1990s, a new interchange was added with the B1206 (the former A15), which is crossed by the Viking Way, which follows the road for over a mile. The section across the Humber was opened on 17 July 1981, by the Queen, and was the world's longest single-span bridge until 1997. The tolls are north of the bridge. It crosses the A63 and meets a roundabout with A164 (for Beverley) and A1105, then turns left along a short section of dual-carriageway (former A63) to end at the A63.

Junction list

Improvements

Holdingham Roundabout (A15 – A17) is due to be signalised in Spring 2021.

See also
 Ermine Street

References

External links

 
 The Society for All British Road Enthusiasts' article on A15

Lincoln, England
North Kesteven District
Borough of North Lincolnshire
Roads in Cambridgeshire
Roads in England
Roads in Lincolnshire
Roads in Yorkshire
Roads with a reversible lane
South Kesteven District
The Deepings
Transport in Huntingdonshire
Transport in Peterborough
Transport in the East Riding of Yorkshire
West Lindsey District